Home Sick is a 2007 American horror film written by E. L. Katz and directed by Adam Wingard.

The film had its world premiere at the 2007 Fantasia Festival.

Plot 
A strange man crashes a party and asks each person to name the person they hate.  With some prodding, they all answer the stranger.  When the named people die in horrible ways, the party-goers suspect that the stranger is a spree killer.

Cast
 Will Akers as Robert
 Brandon Carroll as Devin
 Patrick Engel as Mathew
 Shaina Fewell as Alexis
 Jeff Dylan Graham as Ben
 L.C. Holt as Anthony
 E. L. Katz as The Cashier
 Matt Lero as Tim
 Bill Moseley as "Mr. Suitcase"
 Forrest Pitts as Mark
 Lindley Praytor as Claire (as Lindley Evans)
 Tiffany Shepis as Candice
 Jonathan Thornton as Boss
 Tom Towles as Uncle Johnny
 XZanthia as Call Girl #1

Production 
The film took almost six years to be released in its final cut.

Release 
Home Sick director's cut debuted on 14 July 2007 at the Fantasia Festival and opened in other film festivals on the dates given below.

Home release 
Home Sick was released on DVD in the United States on August 26, 2008.

Reception 
Bloody Disgusting rated it 3/5 stars and wrote that the film is "absolutely worth the wait. It’s not the best low budget horror film to ever come along but it definitely hits a home run with the special effects work".  Adam Tyner of DVD Talk rated it 3/5 stars and called it "sick, twisted, and really offbeat."  Paul Pritchard of DVD Verdict criticized the film for its focus on gore over story.

References

External links 
 
 
 

2007 films
2007 horror films
American splatter films
Films directed by Adam Wingard
2000s English-language films
2000s American films